Stewartsville is a census-designated place (CDP) in Bedford County, Virginia, United States. The population as of the 2020 census was 533. The CDP is located in western Bedford County, along Virginia State Route 24, between Vinton and Chamblissburg. It is part of the Lynchburg Metropolitan Statistical Area.

Geography
According to the United States Census Bureau, the CDP has a total area of 2.531 square miles (6.56 km²).

Demographics

The community was delineated by the US Census Bureau for the first time in 2020. 

As of the census of 2020, there were 533 people residing in the CDP. There were 245 housing units. The racial makeup of the CDP was 95.3% White, 1.7% African American or Black, 0.0% American Indian, 0.2% Asian, 0.0% Pacific Islander, 0.0% from other races, and 2.8% from two or more races. Hispanic or Latino of any race were 1.1% of the population.

Government
The United States Postal Service does not operate a post office within the CDP. Addresses use a Vinton or Goodview ZIP code.

Law enforcement is provided by the Bedford County Sheriff's Office. Fire protection is provided by the Stewartsville-Chamblissburg Volunteer Fire Department, which operates two fire stations, including one within the CDP. Emergency medical services are provided by the Bedford County Department of Fire and Rescue and Stewartsville Volunteer Rescue Squad, which operate from a station within the CDP.

Education
The CDP is served by Bedford County Public Schools. Public school students residing in Stewartsville are zoned to attend either Goodview Elementary School or Stewartsville Elementary School, Staunton River Middle School, and Staunton River High School. 

The closest higher education institutions are located in Bedford and Roanoke.

Transportation

Air
The Roanoke-Blacksburg Regional Airport is the closest airport with commercial service to the CDP.

Highways
 Virginia State Route 24

Rail
The closest passenger rail service is located in Roanoke.

References 

Populated places in Bedford County, Virginia
Census-designated places in Bedford County, Virginia
Census-designated places in Virginia